The 1960–61 Princeton Tigers men's basketball team represented Princeton University in intercollegiate college basketball during the 1959–60 NCAA University Division men's basketball season. Franklin Cappon began the season as head coach. In January 1961, Cappon suffered a mild heart attack, and Jake McCandless took over his role as head coach following Cappon's hospitalization.  The team captain was Donald Swan.  The team posted a 9–2 record under Cappon and then a 9–6 record with McCandless at the helm. The team played its home games in the Dillon Gymnasium in Princeton, New Jersey.  The team was the champion of the Ivy League, earning an invitation to the 24-team 1961 NCAA Division I men's basketball tournament.

After losing its first game under McCandless, the team won six of the next seven. The team posted an 18-8 overall record and an 11-3 conference record. Then, the next night at the Coliseum in the consolation game, they lost to the  85–67.

Peter C. Campbell, who finished second in the conference to 's George Ramming in scoring title with an 18.1 points per game average in conference games, and Al Kaemmerlen were both first team All-Ivy League selections.

References

Princeton Tigers men's basketball seasons
Princeton
Princeton
Princeton Tigers men's basketball
Princeton Tigers men's basketball